Duitama is a city and municipality in the department of Boyacá. It is the capital of the Tundama Province. Duitama has existed since pre-Columbian times, when the Muisca inhabited the hills surrounding a former lake in the valley. The original name of Duitama was "Tundama", named after cacique Tundama.

Etymology 
The name of Duitama means "to me the tribute" in muyskkubun (Muisca language). In its beginnings, Duitama corresponded to a Muisca village ruled by the cacique Tundama, a word that changed for Duitama, absolute and powerful lord that he had as bosses tributaries to the Onzaga, Soatá, Chitagoto, Susacón or Cabita, Icabuco, Lupachoque, Sátiva, Tutazá and Cerinza caciques. The natives lived in bohíos, looking for the heights of the plain of the Indians, Tigua, today hills of La Milagrosa, Cargua, La Tolosa, San José (La Alacranera) and Tocogua.

Geography 
Duitama, situated on the Altiplano Cundiboyacense is bounded to the north by the department of Santander; Charalá and Encino, to the south by the Boyacá municipalities of Tibasosa and Paipa, to the east with the municipalities of Santa Rosa de Viterbo and Floresta.

Climate

History 

Duitama in the times before the Spanish conquest was called Tundama.

Conquest of Duitama 

Before the Spanish conquest, the Muisca were organized in a loose  Muisca Confederation. The confederation was composed of four main political and religious leaders, from south to north; the zipa based in Bacatá, the zaque of Hunza, the iraca of Sugamuxi and the Tundama of Duitama, then called Tundama. Additionally, more independent caciques governed other villages.

The Tundama ruled over the villages of Onzaga, Soatá, Chitagoto, Susacón, Icabuco, Lupachoque, Sátiva, Tutazá and Cerinza. The Tundama lived on the hill currently called La Tolosa.

In 1536, Spanish conquistador Gonzalo Jiménez de Quesada set foot from the Caribbean coastal city of Santa Marta towards the inner highlands of then unexplored Colombia with an army of 800 men. After conquering the southern areas of the Muisca, accessed from the shores of the Magdalena River he and a reduced number of troops marched towards the northern Muisca territories. He first submitted Hunza, the seat of the zaque and in September 1537 he arrived in Sugamuxi, sacred City of the Sun where his soldiers burned the Sun Temple.

The cacique Tundama heard about the invading foreigners and tried to win time while hiding his treasures from the Spanish. One of his men proposed to surrender to the soldiers armed with superior weapons, and Tundama cut off his ears and left hand. 

At the end of 1539, another Spanish conquistador who proved himself in the Kingdom of Quito and Peru, Baltasar Maldonado, entered the Tundama territories and after several battles Tundama surrendered to the Spanish rule. Tundama was killed by a hammer of Maldonado in late December 1539.

Tundama in Muisca history

Colonial period 
During the colonial period of the newly established state New Kingdom of Granada, Duitama was converted to catholicism by friars of Santo Domingo, arriving in 1556. They held their positions until 1775.

Modern Duitama was not founded until 1819, before Simón Bolívar liberated the later state of Gran Colombia from the Spanish rule.

Modern age 
Duitama was an agricultural community that grew after the installation of the train station in 1923 and the connection with the Colombian capital via highway. From 1950 onwards the city hosted more industry.

International events 
In 1995, Duitama was the second city in Latin America to host the UCI Road World Championships. The first city to host that event was San Cristóbal, Venezuela in 1977.

Tourism 
In Duitama the touristic village Pueblito Boyacense is a popular destination. The village is composed of colonial houses.

Born in Duitama 
 Camila Pinzón, model and Miss World Colombia 2022
 Alberto Camargo, former professional cyclist
 Édgar Fonseca, professional cyclist
 Daniel Rincón, former professional cyclist
 Oliverio Rincón, former professional cyclist
 Francisco Rodríguez Maldonado, former professional cyclist

Gallery

References

External links 

  Animated video about Tundama, showing the former lake

 
Populated places established in 1819
1819 establishments in the Spanish Empire